Salama or Salamah may refer to:

People

Given name 
 Umm Salama (circa 596–680), wife of Muhammad
 Salama Abu Hashim, one of the companions of Muhammad
 Umm Salama bint Ya'qub al-Makhzumi, Arab nobility and principal wife of Arab caliph al-Saffah (r. 750–754).
 Salamah ibn al-Akwa (died c. 757 or 781), one of the companions of Muhammad
 Salamah ibn Dinar al-Madani (died c. 757 or 781), Persian Muslim ascetic, jurist and narrator of hadith
 Salama bint Said, later Emily Ruete (1844–1924), daughter of Sultan Sayyid Said of Zanzibar and Oman
 Salama Moussa (1887–1958), notable Egyptian journalist and reformer
 Salama al-Khufaji, member of the Interim Iraq Governing Council (2003–2004)

Royalty 
 Aba Salama or Frumentius (died c. 360), bishop of Aksum
 Salama II (Aksum) or Minas of Aksum (6th century), bishop of Aksum
 Sallamah Umm Abdallah (714–775), mother of Abbasīd caliph al-Mansur
 Abuna Salama II (r. 1348–1388)
 Abuna Salama III (r. 1841–1867)
 Salama bint Hamdan Al Nahyan, Emirati royal

Surname
 Amine Salama (born 2000), French footballer
 Fathy Salama (born 1969), Egyptian musician
 Hasan Salama (1913–1948), commander of the Palestinian Holy War Army
 Hannu Salama (born 1936), Finnish author
 Kareem Salama ( 2006–pres.), American country singer of Egyptian descent
 Mohamed Salamah (1899–1982), Egyptian Quran reciter
 Mohamed Yousri Salama (1974–2013), Egyptian politician
 Peter Salama (1968–2020), Australian epidemiologist

Places
 Salama, Jaffa, a depopulated Palestinian Arab village
 Salamah, Saudi Arabia
 Salamah, Syria
 Salamá, Guatemala
 Salamá, Olancho, Honduras
 Sallama, Israel
 Dayr Abu Salama, a depopulated Palestinian village 
 Dor Salamah (Sabah), Yemen

Transportation
 Al Salamah, a motor yacht 
 Fulk al Salamah (ship), Omani transport ship
 Fulk Al Salamah (2016 yacht)

Other uses
 Salama (company), common name for Islamic Arab Insurance Company, in Dubai
 Salama (roller coaster), at Linnanmäki Park,Finland
 Salama, a character in Amagi Brilliant Park
 Salamah College, in Chester Hill, New South Wales, Australia

See also
 Salameh (disambiguation)
 Salami (disambiguation)
 Salamé, a surname
 Banu Salama, a family that governed the regions of Huesca and Barbitanya (Barbastro) in the Upper March of Al-Andalus c. 780-800